The Magician's Assistant is a novel by American author Ann Patchett, published in 1997 by Harcourt. The book was shortlisted for the 1998 Women's Prize for Fiction. The narrative follows a young woman named Sabine in the aftermath of her husband's death.

Summary
A magician named Parsifal dies of AIDS. He leaves behind a young widow, Sabine, and a series of mysteries. Sabine discovers various secrets and details about her husband and meets his family members.

Reception
The New York Times praised the novel as "beguiling" but argued the protagonist "never generates enough sympathy to make her predicament truly absorbing." Writing in The Independent, Penelope Lively described The Magician's Assistant as "a lovely book by a writer to watch".

Awards
The Magician's Assistant was shortlisted for the Women's Prize for Fiction in 1998.

References

Novels by Ann Patchett
1997 novels